Spring Creek Township is located in Pike County, Illinois. As of the 2010 census, its population was 591 and it contained 295 housing units.

The village of Nebo, Illinois is on the west side of the township, at the intersection of County Highway 7 and County Highway 10, also called Vin Fiz Road.

Geography

Demographics

References

External links
City-data.com
Illinois State Archives

Townships in Pike County, Illinois
Townships in Illinois